Paul Marcel Raymond (February 27, 1913 – April 4, 1995) was a Canadian professional ice hockey forward who played 65 games in the National Hockey League for the Montreal Canadiens. He was born in Montreal, Quebec.

External links
 

1913 births
1995 deaths
Canadian ice hockey forwards
Montreal Canadiens players
New Haven Eagles players
Providence Reds players
Quebec Castors players
Ice hockey people from Montreal
Springfield Indians players
Windsor Bulldogs (1929–1936) players